Zebedee Soanes (born 24 June 1976) is a British radio presenter who presents the weekday evening music show Smooth Classics at Seven on Classic FM. He was previously a newsreader and continuity announcer on BBC Radio 4 and BBC Radio 4 Extra until June 2022. He has collaborated in concert performances, particularly with the vocal ensemble Opus Anglicanum, and has published the children's book series Gaspard the Fox.

Early life and education
Soanes was born in Lowestoft in Suffolk, the son of a Methodist minister. He is named after the Biblical fisherman Zebedee, who was the father of two of Jesus' disciples. Soanes has two sisters, Anna and Rebecca.

Soanes was educated at Northfield St Nicholas Infants School and then Harris Middle School in Lowestoft and then at Denes High School, a state comprehensive school in the town, followed by the University of East Anglia, where he read Drama and Creative Writing. He then taught drama and toured Britain as an actor.

Life and career

Early career and Shipping Forecast
Near the end of his degree course Soanes appeared on a BBC Local Radio station, promoting a charity improvised comedy show in which he was taking part. He was spotted by one of the presenters and a few days later Soanes was called back to improvise some impersonations live on air.

Soanes was a presentation announcer for the television channels BBC One and BBC Two. His was the first voice of BBC Four when the digital channel launched in March 2002 and was the channel's sole announcer for the first ten months. He left BBC television in February 2003 and took up a position with BBC Radio 4 on 9 February 2003.

In 2001, he began reading the Shipping Forecast, a weather report for the seas around the British Isles, which is broadcast four times a day on BBC Radio 4. For the 2008 Beijing Olympics he was asked to read the shipping forecast to a worldwide audience of over a billion. Describing the forecast in 2012, Soanes said: "To the non-nautical, [it] is a nightly litany of the sea... It reinforces a sense of being islanders with a proud seafaring past. Whilst the listener is safely tucked-up in their bed, they can imagine small fishing-boats bobbing about at Plymouth or 170ft waves crashing against Rockall."

Writing in the foreword to the 2020 The Shipping Forecast Puzzle Book, published by BBC Books, he explained: "The forecast gives the wind direction and force, atmospheric pressure, visibility and the state of the sea. It is a nightly litany with a rhythm and indefinable poetry that have made it popular with millions of people who never have cause to put to sea and have little idea what it actually means; a reminder that whilst you're tucked-up safely under the bedclothes, far out over the waves it’s a wilder and more dangerous picture, one that captures the imagination and leads it into uncharted waters whilst you sleep. Dependable, reassuring and never hurried, in these especially uncertain times The Shipping Forecast is a still small voice of calm across the airwaves."

Later radio career
Soanes has been a newsreader for Radio 4's Today, PM and the Six O’Clock News. He is a regular newsreader on The News Quiz, joining the programme under the chairmanship of Sandi Toksvig, then Miles Jupp and in 2013 accompanied the programme on its first visit to the Edinburgh Festival.

He acted with Toby Jones in the radio drama Beautiful Dreamers and has reported for BBC Radio's long-running series From Our Own Correspondent. He has also presented BBC Radio 3’s Saturday Classics, the first edition of which consisted of three hours of favourite sea-inspired music. In December 2010, Radio Times magazine placed Soanes in the list of the seven most recognisable voices in Britain. He voiced a series of documentaries for the Doctor Who 50th anniversary, the launch of Sherlock in the US and is in Mayday, a short film with Juliet Stevenson.

Author Francesca Simon, creator of Horrid Henry, featured Soanes as the newsreader in The Lost Gods, her 2013 book for older children.

In a July 2015 poll of favourite radio voices in The Sunday Times, Soanes was voted as the favourite male voice. His voice was described, by the paper's radio critic Paul Donovan, as smoother than that of the favourite female Jane Garvey and as "evoking an earlier, more formal BBC". In September 2015, he played a vintage radio announcer in the BBC Radio 4 drama Dead Girls Tell No Tales.

In April 2016, Soanes played Derek Nimmo in the radio drama All Mouth and Trousers, by Mark Burgess, the story behind the making of the television comedy series All Gas and Gaiters. The reviews for the programme were generally positive with The Sunday Times Paul Donovan saying "Zeb Soanes is terrific as its star, Derek Nimmo" and Gillian Reynolds of The Sunday Telegraph commenting "Zeb Soanes makes an ace Derek Nimmo." Also in 2016 he played the sinister librarian in a Doctor Who audio adventure called The Unbound Universe with David Warner as The Doctor.

At Christmas 2018, Soanes appeared as part of the team for the University of East Anglia on BBC's Christmas University Challenge. On Christmas Day, the team lost to University of Westminster by 100 points to 130.

In June 2022, it was announced that, from 4 July, Soanes would be joining Classic FM to present Smooth Classics at Seven, a three-hour programme of calming classical music every weekday evening, from 7pm.

The Proms and concert performances 
Soanes returned to BBC Four television in August 2006 as a presenter for the BBC Proms.

In 2017 he presented a television tribute to The Proms on the occasion of the First Night of The Proms, in sepia tone in the style of a vintage programme. The sequence included photographs, radio and TV footage from the history of the concerts, with Soanes partly presenting in Received Pronunciation, fitting the style of early BBC programmes.

On 24 November 2013, he took the role of God in a production of Noye's Fludde for BBC Radio 3, as part of the station's celebration of Benjamin Britten's centenary.

In November 2014, he participated in a concert by the vocal ensemble Opus Anglicanum at Wells Cathedral, featuring the poetry of George Herbert and has appeared in numerous productions with them since. The ensemble has touring an entire reading of Coleridge's The Rime of the Ancient Mariner, set to music by Lynne Plowman.

In 2016, Soanes was narrator for The Snowman by the Brandenburg Sinfonia at St Martin-in-the-Fields, with Andrew Earis conductor. In 2019, the church commissioned him to rewrite the libretto for Vaughan Williams' 1958 nativity pageant, The First Nowell, presented as a charity gala casting BBC colleagues Dame Jenni Murray as God and Evan Davis as a Wise Man.

He was narrator for Peter and the Wolf and Little Red Riding Hood at the Wimbledon International Music Festival, with Leo Geyer conductor. The Daily Telegraph has described Soanes as "the go-to person for music narration, specialising in children's concerts". Andrew Baker, son of broadcaster Richard Baker, has said "It is unusual .... for  newsreaders to come from a non-journalistic background, but this seems to have been Zeb's path, just as it was my father's, so the state school, university, actor, BBC trajectory is uncannily similar."

In March 2017, Soanes appeared, alongside Carole Boyd, in a new recording of Façade by William Walton  and Edith Sitwell, produced by Andrew Keener. Christine Labroche, of concertoNet.com said of the recording: "These two celebrated voices chant the strange poems of Edith Sitwell with an infallible rhythm and a perfect, stretched or swift diction." Andrew Baker also  praised Soanes for the way he had performed Façade: "My father regarded Façade as the pinnacle of the narrator's art, a hugely enjoyable challenge, and a celebration of clarity, breathing, projection and timing. Zeb has all of these attributes, and it's always a pleasure to hear him at work."

On Twelfth Night, 5 January 2021, he appeared in a YouTube video with The King's Singers performing John Julius Norwich's humorous correspondence The Twelve Days of Christmas surrounding the gifts given in the traditional carol.

Charitable work
Soanes is patron of two charities – Awards for Young Musicians and the British Association of Performing Arts Medicine. He is also the first patron of The Mammal Society and is a patron of the Thaxted Festival.

During the 2020 coronavirus lockdown, Soanes created "celebriTEAS", a comedy podcast, impersonating theatrical heroes to raise money for the Equity Benevolent Fund and Acting for Others. It was warmly endorsed by fellow broadcaster Stephen Fry

On 4 March 2021, to promote World Book Day, Soanes appeared on the Early Evening News on BBC London.

In April 2022, Soanes helped launch a community project with the unveiling a maquette of a statue, by sculptor Ian Rank-Broadley, of Benjamin Britten, to be located on the seafront at Lowestoft.

Personal life
The Soanes family's presence in Lowestoft dates back to the 1700s. Interviewed in 2011, Soanes said that he enjoyed  acting as it gave him a chance to act out a character hugely different from his own calm, measured personality, saying "Working on a character is the most rewarding because you get to put yourself in someone else’s mind."

Soanes lives in Islington, North London and returns to Suffolk whenever he can. Formerly a resident of Highgate, he was made a Freeman of Highgate, by means of the ancient Swearing on the Horns ceremony, on 25 February 2015, at the Duke's Head public house.

He has a love of classical music and plays the piano. In Who's Who he is listed as being a member of The Garrick Club and the Southwold Sailors' Reading Room. Soanes is represented by agents   Curtis Brown.

On 1 April 2021, at the age of 44, Soanes suffered a stroke, resulting in him having to take three months off work to convalesce. He subsequently embarked on work with the Stroke Association to raise awareness of the condition.

Books 
In 2018, independent Welsh publisher Graffeg announced that Soanes was to collaborate with illustrator James Mayhew on a series of children's books about an injured urban fox which had appeared at Soanes' home, and which he and his partner had subsequently befriended. The book, Gaspard the Fox, was published in May 2018 and includes illustrations inspired by Soanes and his partner Christophe: "It was also important for James and I to include a positive representation of a gay couple in a very matter-of-fact way, and so my real-life relationship with Christophe and the fox is depicted at the end." The second book, Gaspard: Best in Show was published in August 2019 and the third, Gaspard's Foxtrot, was published in March 2021.

Gaspard's Foxtrot has also been adapted as a major new concert work by the British composer Jonathan Dove in the tradition of Peter and the Wolf, which was filmed by the Royal Scottish National Orchestra on 20 May, as part of its brand-new digital National Schools Concert Programme 2021. It received its world premiere on 29 July 2021 at the Three Choirs Festival, with the Philharmonia Orchestra, conducted by Alice Farnham.

During the 2020 coronavirus lockdown, Soanes created a video series, on his own YouTube channel, called Gaspard’s Den, exploring and explaining the changed world as a spin-off from his children's books. The videos drew viewers from all over the world whose pictures and letters were shared in each episode.

Soanes' fourth book, Fred and the Fantastic Tub-Tub, illustrated by Anja Uhren, was scheduled for publication, by Graffeg, on 10 March 2022.

Works

Discography 
 Facade, Orchid Classics, 2017
 Mediaeval Carols III – Opus Anglicanum
 In Parenthesis – Opus Anglicanum
 An English Music – Opus Anglicanum
 The Great and Wide Sea – Opus Anglicanum

References

External links
 
 
 Gaspard the Fox at gaspardthefox.com
 "How one man befriended an urban fox" from BBC London
 Zebedee Soanes profile at bbc.co.uk
 "Ted 'Golden Pipes' Williams" from BBC Newsnight

1976 births
Living people
English male radio actors
English radio presenters
Radio and television announcers
BBC Radio 4
BBC Radio 3
People from Lowestoft
Alumni of the University of East Anglia
People from Canonbury
English gay actors
English gay writers
English LGBT writers
British LGBT journalists
British LGBT broadcasters
Actors from London
Actors from Suffolk
English male voice actors